This is a list of the joint premiers of the Province of Canada, who were the heads of government of the Province of Canada from the 1841 unification of Upper Canada and Lower Canada until Confederation in 1867.

Each administration was led by two men; after Sydenham's Ministry, one from Canada West (now Ontario) and one from Canada East (now Quebec). Officially, one of them at any given time had the title of Premier, while the other had the title of Deputy.

Colour key
 Green – reformers (Reform Party, Rouges Party, etc.)
 Yellow – conservatives (see Family Compact, Château Clique)
 Red – Liberal Party, Clear Grits
 Blue – Liberal-Conservative Party, Parti bleu

Sydenham's Ministry

Premiers: before responsible government

Premiers: after responsible government

Notes

 
Lists of Canadian first ministers